Zarina Diyas was the defending champion, but lost in the quarterfinals to Zhang Shuai.

Hsieh Su-wei won her first title in six years, beating Amanda Anisimova in the final 6–2, 6–2.

Seeds

Draw

Finals

Top half

Bottom half

Qualifying

Seeds

Qualifiers

Qualifying draw

First qualifier

Second qualifier

Third qualifier

Fourth qualifier

References
Main Draw
Qualifying Draw

Japan Women's Open - Singles
2018 Singles
2018 Japan Women's Open